The Iran Football Championship Cup or Iran Championship Cup was a football tournament held in Iran between 1957 to 1968. These official football matches were held under the supervision of the Football Federation of Iran.

Winners

Performances

Clubs

See also
Football in Iran
Iran's Premier Football League
Iranian football league system
List of Iranian football champions

Sources
List at RSSSF

References

Football in Iran
1957 establishments in Iran